Francisco Arturo Alarcón Cruz (born 25 February 1990) is a Chilean footballer who currently plays for Primera B de Chile club Universidad de Concepción as a centre back and a defensive midfielder.

International career
He represented Chile U23 at the 2008 Inter Continental Cup in Malaysia.

References

External links
 Francisco Alarcón at Football Lineups
 

1990 births
Living people
People from Santiago
People from Santiago Province, Chile
People from Santiago Metropolitan Region
Chilean footballers
Chilean expatriate footballers
Association football defenders
Footballers from Santiago
Unión Española footballers
San Martín de San Juan footballers
Everton de Viña del Mar footballers
Rangers de Talca footballers
C.D. Antofagasta footballers
Club Deportivo Palestino footballers
Universidad de Concepción footballers
Santiago Wanderers footballers
Chilean Primera División players
Argentine Primera División players
Primera B de Chile players
Expatriate footballers in Argentina
Chilean expatriates in Argentina
Chilean expatriate sportspeople in Argentina